Om Prakash Sharma may refer to:

 Om Prakash Sharma (artist) (born 1932), Indian painter, visual artist, and professor
 Om Prakash Sharma (Delhi politician) (born 1953), Indian politician from Delhi
 Om Prakash Sharma (Nagaland politician), Indian former governor of Nagaland
 Om Prakash Sharma (Nepali politician), Minister of Province 2
 Om Prakash Sharma (Uttar Pradesh politician) (died 2021), Indian politician
 Om Prakash Sharma (writer) (1924–1998), Indian writer of detective fiction

See also
 O. P. Sharma (disambiguation)